Nawnghkam may refer to:

 Nawnghkam, Hkamti, Burma
 Nawnghkam, Hsi Hseng, Burma
 Nawnghkam, Mawkmai, Burma